Atswawaka, also called Atsahuaca, or Atsawaka-Yamiaka, is an extinct Panoan language of Peru. Atsahuaca is the name that the tribe calls themselves, meaning "children of the manioc" in their own language. Alternate spellings of the name of the Atswakaka language include: Atsawaka, Atsawaca, Astahuaca, Yamiaca, Yamiaka, Atsawaka-Yamiaka, and Atsahuaca-Yamiaca.

There were 20 speakers in 1904.

Alphabet 
The Atswawaka alphabet uses 24 letters commonly, and has 8 characters used for vowels.

Vocabulary 
Man - t'harki
Woman - tcinani
Yes - ei
No - tcama
Tea - ita
Tree  - isthehowa

References 

Panoan languages
Indigenous languages of Western Amazonia
Languages of Peru
Extinct languages of South America